Saturday Club is a historic women's club clubhouse located at Wayne, Delaware County, Pennsylvania. It was built in 1899, and is a 1 1/2-story, English Half Timber frame building.  It measures approximately 55 feet by 75 feet, and has a gable roof with three gabled dormers.  Its appearance is patterned after Shakespeare's Birthplace in Stratford-on-Avon, England.

It was added to the National Register of Historic Places in 1978.

References

External links
Saturday Club website

Women's clubs in the United States
Clubhouses on the National Register of Historic Places in Pennsylvania
Tudor Revival architecture in Pennsylvania
Cultural infrastructure completed in 1899
Buildings and structures in Delaware County, Pennsylvania
History of women in Pennsylvania
1899 establishments in Pennsylvania
National Register of Historic Places in Delaware County, Pennsylvania